Karl Johann Holzapfel (10 October 1923 – 12 August 2009) was an Austrian field hockey player. He competed at the 1948 Summer Olympics and the 1952 Summer Olympics.

References

External links
 

1923 births
2009 deaths
Austrian male field hockey players
Olympic field hockey players of Austria
Field hockey players at the 1948 Summer Olympics
Field hockey players at the 1952 Summer Olympics
Place of birth missing